Michael Earl Nolan (born January 11, 1911 in Vancouver, British Columbia - died April 6, 1991 in Tucson, Arizona) was an American football player for the Chicago Cardinals of the National Football League.

References

1911 births
Canadian players of American football
Chicago Cardinals players
Sportspeople from Vancouver
1991 deaths
Gridiron football people from British Columbia